Norbert Stolzenburg (born 12 May 1952) is a German football manager and former player.

Stolzenburg was born in Berlin, and scored a record 122 goals in 210 games for Tennis Borussia Berlin, also becoming the top scorer of the 1975–76 2. Bundesliga Nord season. Furthermore, Stolzenburg scored three goals in four games for Eintracht Braunschweig during the 1976–77 UEFA Cup. After his spell in Braunschweig he played for MSV Duisburg in the Bundesliga.

Stolzenburg is currently the manager of Berliner SV 1892.

References

External links 
 

1952 births
Living people
Footballers from Berlin
German footballers
Association football forwards
Bundesliga players
2. Bundesliga players
Hertha Zehlendorf players
Tennis Borussia Berlin players
Eintracht Braunschweig players
MSV Duisburg players
German football managers
West German footballers